Schroeder Spur is a large mountain spur lying south of Edwards Glacier and the parallel Thompson Spur, at the south end of Daniels Range, Usarp Mountains. Mapped by United States Geological Survey (USGS) from surveys and U.S. Navy air photos, 1960–63. Named by Advisory Committee on Antarctic Names (US-ACAN) for Lauren A. Schroeder, United States Antarctic Research Program (USARP) biologist at McMurdo Station, 1967–68.

Ridges of Victoria Land
Pennell Coast
Mountain spurs